Haich may be:
a surname 
 Elisabeth Haich, Hungarian spiritual leader
a misspelling for Haitch, the name of the letter H